No Filter is the sixth album from Json, released on March 10, 2015, through Lamp Mode Recordings. Json worked with producers D-Flow, G-Roc, Geeda, J.R., and Mashell Leroy.

Background
This album is the sixth for Jsons' career, and it comes after Braille that was released in 2013. The album is produced by D-Flow, G-Roc, Geeda, J.R., and Mashell Leroy.

Reception

Signaling in a four and a half star review by New Release Tuesday, Mark Ryan recognizes, "the album is powerful." E. Pluribus Unum, indicating for Z180 Radio in a 4.65 out of five star review, realizes, with respect to this release "This praise is earned." Specifying for Wade-O Radio, Mikaela responds, "No Filter is another solid album from the St. Louis native, who used a concept to not only highlight the struggles we constantly face, but he presents a solution to it all."

Track listing

Charts

References

External links
 Houston Chronicle interview

2015 albums
Json (rapper) albums